Lake Moro may refer to:

 Lake Moro (Valle Brembana)
 Lake Moro (Valle Camonica)